The Ohio State Buckeyes women's ice hockey program represent the Ohio State University during the 2017-18 NCAA Division I women's ice hockey season.

Roster

2017–18 Buckeyes

Standings

2017-18 schedule

|-
!colspan=12 style=""| Regular Season

|-
!colspan=12 style=""| WCHA Tournament

Awards and honors
Jincy Dunne, 2017-18 Second Team All-America

References

Ohio State
NCAA women's ice hockey Frozen Four seasons
Ohio State Buckeyes women's ice hockey seasons
Ohio State
Ohio State
Ohio State